Chichester Samuel Parkinson-Fortescue, 2nd Baron Clermont and 1st Baron Carlingford  (18 January 1823 – 30 January 1898), known as Chichester Fortescue until 1863 and as Chichester Parkinson-Fortescue between 1863 and 1874 and Lord Carlingford after 1874, was a British Liberal politician of the 19th century.

Background and education
Born Chichester Fortescue, Carlingford was the son of Chichester Fortescue (died 1826), Member of Parliament for Hillsborough in the Irish Parliament. 
He came of an old Anglo-Irish family settled in Ireland since the days of Sir Faithful Fortescue (1581–1666), whose uncle, The 1st Baron Chichester, was Lord Deputy. 
The history of the family was written by his elder brother, Thomas Fortescue, who in 1852 was created Baron Clermont. His mother was Martha Angel, daughter of Samuel Meade Hobson. 
The future Lord Carlingford was educated at Christ Church, Oxford, where he took a first in Classics (1844) and won the chancellor's English essay (1846). 
In 1863, he assumed by Royal Licence the additional surname of Parkinson as heir to his aunt's husband, William Parkinson Ruxton.

Political career
In 1847, the then Chichester Fortescue was elected to Parliament for Louth as a Liberal. 
He became a junior Lord of the Treasury in 1854 under Lord Palmerston, a post he held until 1855, and was later Under-Secretary of State for the Colonies under Palmerston between 1857 and 1858 and 1859 and 1865. 
He was admitted to the Imperial Privy Council in 1864 and the following year he was made Chief Secretary for Ireland under Lord Russell, a post which he again occupied under William Ewart Gladstone from 1868 to 1871 (this time with a seat in the Cabinet). 
In 1866, he was also admitted to the Irish Privy Council. 
He was then President of the Board of Trade between 1871 and 1874. 
In the latter year he was elevated to the peerage as Baron Carlingford, of Carlingford in the County of Louth.

Lord Carlingford later served under Gladstone as Lord Privy Seal between 1881 and 1885 and as Lord President of the Council between 1883 and 1885. 
In 1882, he was appointed a Knight of the Order of St Patrick. 
He parted from Gladstone on the question of Irish Home Rule, but in earlier years he was his active supporter on Irish questions.

Personal life

Lord Carlingford married Frances Elizabeth Anne, Countess Waldegrave, daughter of John Braham, in 1863. She had been married three times before, the second time to The 7th Earl Waldegrave. There were no children from the marriage. Carlingford's influence in society was due largely to her. She died in July 1879, aged 58.

In 1887, Carlingford's brother, Lord Clermont, died, and Carlingford inherited his peerage according to a special remainder, after which he was known as Lord Carlingford and Clermont.

He died at Marseille, France, in January 1898, aged 75. 
Both his titles became extinct on his death for lack of heirs as his marriage had produced no children.

Arms

References

Attribution:

Sources

External links 

 
 

1823 births
1898 deaths
Alumni of Christ Church, Oxford
Barons in the Peerage of the United Kingdom
Chichester
Knights of St Patrick
Lord-Lieutenants of Essex
Members of the Privy Council of Ireland
Members of the Privy Council of the United Kingdom
Parkinson-Fortescue, Chichester
Parkinson-Fortescue, Chichester
Parkinson-Fortescue, Chichester
Parkinson-Fortescue, Chichester
Parkinson-Fortescue, Chichester
Parkinson-Fortescue, Chichester
Parkinson-Fortescue, Chichester
Parkinson-Fortescue, Chichester
Clermont, B2
UK MPs who were granted peerages
Chief Secretaries for Ireland
Fortescue family
Liberal Party (UK) hereditary peers
Liberal Unionist Party peers
Presidents of the Board of Trade
Peers of the United Kingdom created by Queen Victoria